Brian David Hill (born 29 December 1982) is a S13 Canadian para-swimmer who has competed in the 2000, 2004, 2008, 2012 Summer Paralympics and the 2007 Parapan American Games. He had won five gold medals, three silver medals and 3 bronze medals in his international career. Hill started swimming as a child and competitive swimming at the age of nine. He has won the British Columbia Blind Sports Award and Athlete of the Year Award.

Personal life 
Hill was born on 29 December 1982 in Duncan, British Columbia with a genetic retinal disorder which results in only ten percent vision. Since the 2004 Summer Paralympics, he has resided in Montreal, Quebec. During his childhood, Hill's parents dug a 17-metre pool for him to swim in. "It was the first sport where I was able to train and compete with other kids at an equal level," he says. He started competitive swimming at the age of nine. Hill's girlfriend Karine Thomas is a member in Canada's Olympic synchronized swimming team. After he retires, he wants to have a culinary career.

Career 
At the age of 17, Hill participated in six events at the 2000 Summer Paralympics in Sydney, Australia. He won silver in the men's 100 metre butterfly in 1:02.79, finished fourth in the 100 metre backstroke in 1:10.39, sixth in the 50 metre freestyle in 27.11, eighth in the 100 metre freestyle in 59.23, eighth in the 400 metre freestyle in 4:54.96 and tenth in the 200 metre individual medley in 2:35.39. Looking back in 2008 on his results, Brian said, "Sydney Games were special because it was my first Paralympic Games and everything. The atmosphere, crowds and facilities were amazing."

At the 2004 Summer Paralympics, Hill won bronze in the 100 metre backstroke in 1:06.97, bronze in the 400 metre freestyle in 4:39.52, finished equal fourth in the 100 metre butterfly in 1:03.90, fifth in the 100 metre freestyle in 59.32, fifth in the 200 metre individual medley in 2:31.07 and 14th in the 50 metre freestyle in 28.09. About the 2004 Paralympics in Greece, Brian said in 2008 that he "was really able to feel the history of the Olympics".

At the 2006 Commonwealth Games in Melbourne, Hill finished ninth in the 50 metre EAD freestyle in 26.68 and ninth in the 100 metre EAD freestyle in 59.58.

Hill won five medals at the 2007 Parapan American Games including three golds and two silvers. He won gold in 100 metre butterfly where he got a time of 1:00.52. He had tied the world record time with Canadian para-swimmer Walter Wu. He had also won another two golds and two silvers. He says "I'm pretty happy with the result overall. Technically it was very good."

Before going to Beijing for his third Paralympic Games, Hill's preparation involved swimming about 120 kilometres in two weeks. Hill said, "I completed about eight to nine workouts a week and spent around 18 to 20 hours per week in the pool,".

At the 2008 Summer Paralympics, Hill finished fifth in the 100 metre backstroke in 1:05.52, 12th in the 100 metre butterfly in 1:03.25, 15th in the 100 metre freestyle in 59.80 and 17th in the 50 metre freestyle in 26.84.

At the 2009 IPC Swimming World Championships 25 m in Rio, Hill won gold in the 100 metre backstroke in a new record time of 59.30, gold in the 100 metre butterfly in a new record time of 57.04 and bronze in the 100 metre freestyle in 54.66. At the 2010 IPC Swimming World Championships, Hill finished fifth in the 100 metre backstroke in 1:04.65.

At the 2012 Summer Paralympics, Hill finished seventh in the 100 metre backstroke in 1:04.97 and equal eighth in the heats 100 metre butterfly with Australia's Sean Russo in 1:01.61. In the swim-off, Russo defeated Hill with each posting times of 1:01.24 and 1:02.72 respectively.

Achievements 
In 2002, Hill won the Sport British Columbia Athlete of the Year award in the athletes with a disability category. He won again in the next year. In 2003, Hill was awarded the Blind Sports award from the British Columbia Blind Sports and Recreation Association (BCBSRA).

References

External links 
 

1982 births
Living people
People from Duncan, British Columbia
Canadian male freestyle swimmers
Canadian male backstroke swimmers
Canadian male butterfly swimmers
Canadian male medley swimmers
Paralympic swimmers of Canada
Paralympic silver medalists for Canada
Paralympic bronze medalists for Canada
Medalists at the 2000 Summer Paralympics
Medalists at the 2004 Summer Paralympics
Swimmers at the 2000 Summer Paralympics
Swimmers at the 2004 Summer Paralympics
Swimmers at the 2008 Summer Paralympics
Swimmers at the 2012 Summer Paralympics
Commonwealth Games competitors for Canada
Swimmers at the 2006 Commonwealth Games
World record holders in paralympic swimming
Medalists at the World Para Swimming Championships
Paralympic medalists in swimming
S13-classified Paralympic swimmers